Klaus Wagn (1937–2021) was a German author and former husband of Argentine-German writer Esther Vilar. They were married for 14 years (1961–1975) and they had a son named Martin in 1963. Vilar said in 1975 they had a divorce, but claimed: "I didn't break up with the man, just with marriage as an institution."
He died October 2021.

Works
Gottesgott by Klaus Wagn (1966)
Das Lust-an-der-Unfreiheit-Modell by Klaus Wagn (1969)
Bewußtsein als eine Struktur von Zeit by Klaus Wagn (1970)
Entwurf einer allgemeinen Theorie des Bewußtseins/Design of a General Theory of Consciousness (bilingual edition) by Klaus Wagn (1971)
Was Zeit ist und was nicht (German Edition of "What Time Does") by Klaus Wagn (1975)
What time does by Klaus Wagn (1976)
Herrschaft der Natur? by Klaus Wagn (2000)
Bewusstsein und Wirklichkeit by Klaus Wagn (2002)
Herr der Zeit by Klaus Wagn (2004)

References

Possibly living people
German male writers
1937 births